The 2002 NASDAQ-100 Open was a tennis tournament played on outdoor hard courts. It was the 18th edition of this tournament and was part of the Tennis Masters Series of the 2002 ATP Tour and of Tier I of the 2002 WTA Tour. Both the men's and women's events took place at the Tennis Center at Crandon Park in Key Biscayne, Florida in the United States from March 18 through 31, 2002.

Finals

Men's singles

 Andre Agassi defeated  Roger Federer 6–3, 6–3, 3–6, 6–4
 It was Agassi's 2nd title of the year and the 52nd of his career. It was his 1st Masters title of the year and his 13th overall. It was his 5th title at the event after winning in 1990, 1995, 1996 and 2001. This was Federer's first Masters final.

Women's singles

 Serena Williams defeated  Jennifer Capriati 7–5, 7–6(7–4)
 It was Williams' 2nd title of the year and the 23rd of her career. It was her 1st Tier I title of the year and her 4th overall.

Men's doubles

 Mark Knowles /  Daniel Nestor defeated  Donald Johnson /  Jared Palmer 6–3, 3–6, 6–1
 It was Knowles' 4th title of the year and the 21st of his career. It was Nestor's 4th title of the year and the 24th of his career.

Women's doubles

 Lisa Raymond /  Rennae Stubbs defeated  Virginia Ruano Pascual /  Paola Suárez 7–6(7–4), 6–7(4–7), 6–3
 It was Raymond's 6th title of the year and the 36th of her career. It was Stubbs' 5th title of the year and the 38th of her career.

External links
 Official website
 ATP Tournament Profile
 WTA Tournament Profile

 
NASDAQ-100 Open
NASDAQ-100 Open
NASDAQ-100 Open
Miami Open (tennis)
NASDAQ-100 Open
NASDAQ-100 Open
NASDAQ-100 Open